The Buena Vista State Forest is a state forest located in Beltrami County, Minnesota. The Minnesota Department of Natural Resources manages  of state lands, with the majority of the forest split between private and other public ownership. The eastern half of the forest falls within the Chippewa National Forest, where Federal lands are managed by the United States Forest Service.

Boating and fishing are popular on the lakes accessible in the forest, including Lake Beltrami, Big Bass Lake, Gull Lake, Sandy Lake, and Three Island Lake.

Outdoor recreation activities include hunting, picnicking, as well as backcountry camping. The snowmobiling trail connects with other regional trails to provide access to Nebish, Blackduck, Turtle River, and Bemidji.

See also
List of Minnesota state forests

External links
Buena Vista State Forest - Minnesota Department of Natural Resources (DNR)

References

Minnesota state forests
Protected areas of Beltrami County, Minnesota
Protected areas established in 1935